The 2001 season was Santos Futebol Clube's eighty-ninth in existence and the club's forty-second consecutive season in the top flight of Brazilian football.

Players

Squad

Statistics

Appearances and goals

Source: Match reports in Competitive matches

Goalscorers

Source: Match reports in Competitive matches

Transfers

In

Out

Friendlies

Competitions

Overall summary

Campeonato Brasileiro

Results summary

Results by round

First stage

League table

Matches

Copa do Brasil

First round

Second round

Campeonato Paulista

First stage

League table

Matches

Knockout stage

Semi-finals

Torneiro Rio-São Paulo

Group stage

Knockout stage

Semi-finals

References

External links
2001 season at Acervo Santista 
2001 season at História Santos FC 

2001
Santos F.C.